Zygmunt Jałoszyński (born 18 June 1946 in Łąki Markowe) is a Polish athlete, who competed in the javelin throw. He represented Poland at the European Championships 1971 where he got to final round. In 1970 he took a bronze medal in 1970 Summer Universiade in Torino (won by Miklos Nemeth). He was representative sports club Legia Warsaw. He was one of the top Polish sportsman in the 1970s decade. Personal best: 85.00 m (25 July 1970 in Łódź).

Bibliography
 Janusz Rozum, Jerzy Szymonek - "Osiągnięcia Polskiej Lekkiej Atletyki w 40-leciu PRL: Rzut Oszczepem Mężczyzn" - Komisja Statystyczna PZLA Warszawa 1984

1946 births
Living people
Polish male javelin throwers
People from Włocławek County
Sportspeople from Kuyavian-Pomeranian Voivodeship
Universiade medalists in athletics (track and field)
Universiade bronze medalists for Poland
Medalists at the 1970 Summer Universiade